Soccer Bowl '82 was the championship final of the 1982 NASL season. The New York Cosmos advanced to the Soccer Bowl for the third consecutive year and took on the Seattle Sounders in a rematch of Soccer Bowl '77. The match was played on September 18, 1982, at Jack Murphy Stadium, in San Diego, California. New York won, 1–0, and were crowned the 1982 NASL champions. This was the Cosmos' fifth North American championship and fourth in the past six years.

Background

New York Cosmos

The New York Cosmos won the Eastern Division with a 23-9 record and a total of 203 points. They defeated the Tulsa Roughnecks in the quarterfinals by two game to one. By virtue of their two-game sweep in the semifinals against the San Diego Sockers, the Cosmos advanced to the NASL championship final for the sixth time in franchise history.

Seattle Sounders
The Seattle Sounders qualified for the playoffs as the Western Division champions with an 18-14 record and a total of 166 points. In the quarterfinals they needed all three games to get past the Toronto Blizzard. Likewise their semifinal match-up took three games to decide a winner. Seattle's two games to one defeat of the Fort Lauderdale Strikers earned the Sounders their second ever trip to the Soccer Bowl.

Game summary
Usual Cosmos starters Steve Moyers, Johan Neeskens and Wim Rijsbergen were injured and unavailable for the match. Seattle dominated the first half outshooting New York, 10–5. Numerous Sounders' chances were either squandered with shots slightly off the mark, or gobbled up by Cosmos goalie, Hubert Birkenmeier. In the 31st minute, and against the run of play, New York sweeper, Carlos Alberto, picked up the ball in midfield and passed it to Julio César Romero. Romero slid the ball to Giorgio Chinaglia on the right side of the penalty area. With his back to goal and using his body to shield the ball, the Cosmos' captain maneuvered to his leftaround Seattle defender, Benny Dargle, and from 12 yards out shot to the left. Goalkeeper Paul Hammond got a piece of it, but the ball nevertheless caromed just inside the left post for the game's only goal. The second half saw considerably less action with New York content to protect their slim lead.

Match details 

1982 NASL Champions: New York Cosmos

Television: USA Network (cable)
Announcers: Spencer Ross, Werner Roth

Match statistics

See also 
 1982 North American Soccer League season

References 

1982
 
1982
1982 in sports in California
Sports competitions in San Diego
Soccer in California
September 1982 sports events in the United States